Phaloe cubana is a moth in the subfamily Arctiinae first described by Gottlieb August Wilhelm Herrich-Schäffer in 1866. It is found in Central America (including Guatemala and Belize), Mexico and Cuba.

References

Moths described in 1866
Arctiinae